The Western Kid is a fictional Old West character appearing in American comic books published by Marvel Comics. The character was the star of Western feature published by Marvel's 1950s precursor, Atlas Comics.

Publication history
Tex Dawson, the Western Kid, debuted in Western Kid #1 (cover-dated Nov. 1954), from publisher Atlas Comics, a predecessor of Marvel Comics. The character was created by an unknown writer and penciler-inker John Romita Sr., who the following decade would become one of Spider-Man's signature artists. The feature, drawn exclusively by Romita, ran through issue #17 (Aug. 1957), with cover art by Romita, Joe Maneely, John Severin, and, for one cover each, Carl Burgos, Russ Heath, and Syd Shores.

The character resurfaced as the lead feature of the omnibus title Gunsmoke Western #51 (March 1959), in a story written by Atlas/Marvel editor-in-chief Stan Lee and drawn by Dick Ayers.

Western Kid reprints appeared in Marvel's 1970s omnibus series Western Gunfighters #3–6 and 17–33 (Dec.1970 – Sept. 1971, Sept. 1973 – Nov. 1975). In-between, the character starred in the reprint series The Western Kid vol. 2, #1–5 (Dec. 1971 – Aug. 1972) — the first issue of which sported a new cover by original artist Romita — and in Rawhide Kid #105 (Nov. 1972) and Gun-Slinger #1–3 (Jan.-June 1973), a series reflecting the character's temporary new name. The first issue, with a cover drawn by Jim Steranko, was titled Tex Dawson, Gun-Slinger.

The character returned in Apache Skies (2002), a four-issue miniseries starring the Rawhide Kid and two persons called the Apache Kid: Dazii Aloysius Kare, and his wife, Rosa. This was a sequel to the miniseries Blaze of Glory (2000), which specifically retconned that the naively clean-cut Marvel Western stories of years past were merely dime novel fictions of the characters' actual lives.

Fictional character biography
Tex Dawson, a.k.a. the Western Kid, was a clean-cut Old West gunfighter with a stallion named Whirlwind and a white German Shepherd dog named Lightning. Unlike such fellow Atlas Western stars as Kid Colt and the Rawhide Kid, he was not hunted by the law for a perceived crime, and unlike the Two-Gun Kid or the Outlaw Kid, he wore no mask. Wandering the range as a do-gooder adventurer, the Western Kid was respected by sheriffs and marshals, whom he often helped, and idolized by children.

Other versions
A modern-day version of the character stars in the five-issue ensemble miniseries Six Guns (#1–4 cover-dated Jan.-March 2012), by writer Andy Diggle and artist Davide Gianfelice, and also starring the extant female mercenary Tarantula and new contemporary versions of the Marvel Old West heroes the Black Rider; Matt Slade; and the Two-Gun Kid.

References

External links
 The Unofficial Handbook of Marvel Comics Creators
 Atlas Tales
 Western Kid at International Heroes

Further reading
Marvel Westerns: Outlaw Files (June 2006)

1954 comics debuts
1957 comics endings
American comics characters
Atlas Comics characters
Atlas Comics titles
Characters created by John Romita Sr.
Comics characters introduced in 1954
Fictional American people
Marvel Comics male characters
Marvel Comics Western (genre) characters
Western (genre) comics
Western (genre) gunfighters